Jiang Jijian is a Chinese paralympic rower. He participated at the 2020 Summer Paralympics in the rowing competition, being awarded the bronze medal in the mixed double sculls event with his teammate, Liu Shuang.

References 

Living people
Place of birth missing (living people)
Year of birth missing (living people)
Chinese male rowers
Rowers at the 2020 Summer Paralympics
Medalists at the 2020 Summer Paralympics
Paralympic medalists in rowing
Paralympic rowers of China
Paralympic bronze medalists for China
21st-century Chinese people